"If I Were Sorry" is a song by Swedish singer Frans Jeppsson Wall. The song was released in Sweden as a digital download on 28 February 2016, and was written by Frans along with Fredrik Andersson, Michael Saxell and Oscar Fogelström. It took part in Melodifestivalen 2016, and qualified to the final from the fourth heat. It later won the final with 156 points, thus earning the right to represent Sweden in the Eurovision Song Contest 2016 in Stockholm, where it placed fifth. In the weeks after its Melodifestivalen heat appearance, the song charted in the Spotify Viral charts in Switzerland, Taiwan, Iceland, Uruguay, the Czech Republic, the United Kingdom, Spain, the United States, Norway, France, Denmark, Turkey and Germany.

Melodifestivalen and Eurovision

"If I Were Sorry" participated in the fourth heat of the 2016 Melodifestivalen, which was held on 27 February 2016 at the Gavlerinken Arena in Gävle. The song was the fifth of the seven competing entries to perform and directly qualified to the contest final as one of the two songs which received the most telephone votes. On 12 March, during the final held at the Friends Arena in Solna, Frans was the tenth of the twelve competing acts to perform, and "If I Were Sorry" won the contest with 156 votes, receiving the highest number of public votes and the second highest number of votes from the international juries.

By virtue of winning the previous year's contest and being the host country, Sweden automatically qualified to the final of the Eurovision Song Contest 2016 in Stockholm on 14 May. "If I Were Sorry" was performed in the ninth position of the 26 competing entries, and Frans subsequently finished in fifth place, receiving 261 points in total, 139 points from the public (including the maximum 12 points from Denmark and Iceland) and 122 points from the juries (including the maximum 12 points from the Czech Republic, Estonia and Finland).

Charts

Weekly charts

Year-end charts

Certifications

Release history

References

2015 songs
2016 singles
Melodifestivalen songs of 2016
Swedish pop songs
Frans Jeppsson-Wall songs
Number-one singles in Sweden
Number-one singles in Poland
English-language Swedish songs
Eurovision songs of Sweden
Eurovision songs of 2016